Ficus sumatrana is an Asian species of fig tree in the family Moraceae.  
No subspecies are listed in the Catalogue of Life; its native range is Indo-China to Malesia.

Description
The species can be found in Vietnam: where it may be called đa trai nhỏ or đa quả nhỏ ("small-fruited banyan").  This refers to the many small fruit (syconia) which are only 4 mm in diameter.  Trees grow to approximately 20 m and the leaves have a small drip point at their apex.

References

External links 
 

sumatrana
Trees of Vietnam
Flora of Indo-China
Flora of Malesia
Plants described in 1867